Discocotyle sagittata is a species of freshwater monogenean gill ectoparasites of Salmo and Oncorhynchus. Their lifestyle is characterised by a free-living larval stage that may be inhaled by a suitable freshwater fish host, after which they may attach upon expulsion over the gill onto a single gill filament. Upon reaching maturity, parasites can remain attached by a posterior opisthaptor with its 8 associated clamps (4 in 2 rows). Adults may reach a few millimetres in length. D. sagittata feeds on the blood of the gills via an anterior mouth part. Adults are hermaphrodite, and produce 3–14 eggs per day at 13 °C, a process which is temperature dependent. Once produced, eggs drop to the riverbed surface and at 13 °C  take 28 days to develop to hatching larval forms. Major parasite burden can result in damage to the host gill and anaemia from blood loss.

References

Polyopisthocotylea